Michael Stich was the defending champion, but lost in the final to Ivan Lendl. The score was 7–5, 6–3.

Seeds
All seeds receive a bye into the second round.

Draw

Finals

Top half

Section 1

Section 2

Bottom half

Section 3

Section 4

References

External links
 Official results archive (ATP)
 Official results archive (ITF)

1991 ATP Tour
1991 Singles